Vladimirea zygophylli is a moth in the family Gelechiidae. It was described by Vladimir Ivanovitsch Kuznetsov in 1960. It is found in Saudi Arabia, Iran and Turkmenistan.

The larvae feed on Zygophyllum species.

References

Vladimirea
Moths described in 1960